Every Body Tells a Story is the title of the debut studio album by actress Brigitte Nielsen.  Released in 1987 and produced by Christian De Walden and Stephen Singer, the album was a Top 30 hit in Italy.

Three singles were released: the title track, Maybe and It's a strange love.

Track listing

It's A Strange Love (3:48) 
Stalking Your Heart (4:09) 
Every Body Tells A Story (3:53) 
The Persuader (3:25) 
Maybe (4:21) 
Shock Me (3:12) 
With You (3:34) 
My Obsession (3:23) 
Keep It Moving (3:34) 
Another Restless Night (4:28)

Personnel 

 Produced and arranged by: Christian de Walden and Steve Singer

References
Discogs.com

1987 albums